Mr. Basketball USA, formerly known as the ESPN RISE National Player of the Year and EA SPORTS National Player of the Year, is an award presented to the United States boys' high school basketball national player of the year by Ballislife.com. Before 1996, retroactive recognition was determined for honorees going back to 1955's selectee Wilt Chamberlain, determined by National High School Hall of Fame member Doug Huff, who has been a McDonald's All-American Game selection committee member since the game's inception, CalHiSports.com Editor Mark Tennis and Ballislife.com National Editor Ronnie Flores.  From 1996–2002 the selections were made by Student Sports and from 2003–2009 by EA Sports. From 2010–2012 the award was determined by ESPN HS until the award was taken over and executed by Flores in 2013 after his tenure with ESPN ended.

According to information posted online by Ballislife, "Selections are based on high school accomplishment, not future college/pro potential, and are reflective of those that lead their teams to state championships. Ballislife does not knowingly select fifth-year players, and those ineligible due to age or academics, Mr. Basketball USA or to its various All-American teams." Furthermore, selection uses "on-the-floor performance" without regard to academics, volunteer work or most other off-the-court criteria.

Current selections are made through a season-long polling process of a 10-member expert panel with a final year-end ballot to determine the winner.  The panel includes five McDonald's All-American selection committee members. The panel is polled weekly for a list of the top seven national player of the year candidates regardless of graduating class. The votes are then translated into a 10-point scoring system,  with 10 points for a first-place vote, nine points for second-place vote, and down to four points for a seventh-place vote.

Winners

G – Guard
CG – Combo guard
PG – Point guard
SG – Shooting guard
F – Forward
PF – Power forward
SF – Small forward
C – Center
— in Runner(s)-up column indicates years in which the voting procedures and the resulting votes yielded a consensus winner with no runner(s)-up named.
— in College column indicates that player either returned to high school or went directly to professional basketball in the subsequent year.

Source:

See also
List of U.S. high school basketball national player of the year awards
Naismith Prep Player of the Year Award
Gatorade Player of the Year awards

Notes

External links
Winner list at ESPN

Awards established in 1955
American basketball trophies and awards
High school basketball in the United States
1955 establishments in the United States